The men's shot put event at the 1994 World Junior Championships in Athletics was held in Lisbon, Portugal, at Estádio Universitário de Lisboa on 22 and 23 July.  A 7.26 kg (Senior implement) shot was used.

Medalists

Results

Final
23 July

Qualifications
22 Jul

Group A

Participation
According to an unofficial count, 17 athletes from 13 countries participated in the event.

References

Shot put
Shot put at the World Athletics U20 Championships